In the Canadian Army, a regiment is placed on the Supplementary Order of Battle when the need for the regiment's existence is no longer relevant. When placed on the Supplementary Order of Battle, a regiment is considered "virtually disbanded", and is re-formed only when the Department of National Defence deems the unit is required again. The Supplementary Order of Battle was instituted as an alternative to outright disbandment during the army rationalizations of the 1960s. If a regiment is re-manned and moved from the Supplementary Order of Battle, it takes its old place in the order of precedence and its colours, traditions and battle honours remain as if there had been no interruption of service.

In the aftermath of the Somalia Affair in 1993, The Canadian Airborne Regiment was completely disbanded and not placed on the Supplementary Order of Battle.

On September 5, 2008, the Defence Minister, Peter MacKay, announced that The Halifax Rifles (RCAC) would be reorganized as an active unit. This was the first and so far only regiment to be reactivated to the Primary Reserve from the Supplementary Order of Battle. Two other regiments have been removed from the Supplementary Reserve by amalgamating them with Primary Reserve units: the Irish Fusiliers of Canada (The Vancouver Regiment) merged into the British Columbia Regiment (Duke of Connaught's Own) in 2002 and the 19th Alberta Dragoons merged into the South Alberta Light Horse in 2006.

Regiments on the Supplementary Order of Battle

Royal Canadian Armoured Corps

Royal Regiment of Canadian Artillery

Royal Canadian Infantry Corps

See also 
 Canadian Militia
 Canadian Army
 Primary Reserve
 History of the Canadian Army
 Militia Act of 1855
 Otter Commission 1920
 National Defence Act 1923
 Kennedy Report on the Reserve Army 1954
 Unification of the Canadian Armed Forces 1968

Notes

References 
 Canadian Army Roll of Regiments 1964
 Government of Canada Announces Reserve Units in Nova Scotia and Northwest Territories

Canadian Army
Regiments of Canada